Samuel Swinfin Burdett (February 21, 1836 – September 24, 1914) was a U.S. Representative from Missouri.

Biography
He was born on February 21, 1836, in The Old Manse, Broughton Astley, bordering Sutton-in-the-Elms in Leicestershire, England. His father was minister at Sutton-in-the-Elms Baptist Chapel.

When twelve years of age he emigrated to the United States.
He worked on a farm in Lorain County, Ohio, and attended the common schools.
He studied law at Oberlin College, Ohio, was admitted to the bar in 1858 and commenced practice in DeWitt, Iowa.
Burdett was an abolitionist and joined John Brown during the Bleeding Kansas conflict in May 1856.
He entered the Union Army as a private in the First Regiment, Iowa Volunteer Cavalry, in May 1861.
He was promoted to the rank of lieutenant, later becoming captain, and served until August 1864.
He served as assistant provost marshal general from March 1, 1864 – August 1, 1864.
He moved to Osceola, St. Clair County, Missouri, in December 1865.
Attorney for the seventh circuit in 1868 and 1869.
He served as delegate to the Republican National Convention in 1868.

Burdett was elected as a Republican to the Forty-first and Forty-second Congresses (March 4, 1869 – March 3, 1873).
He served as chairman of the Committee on Manufactures (Forty-second Congress).
He was an unsuccessful candidate in 1872 for reelection to the Forty-third Congress.
He resumed the practice of law in Osceola, Missouri.
He was appointed Commissioner of the General Land Office in 1874.
He engaged in the practice of law in Washington, D.C., residing at Glencarlyn, Virginia, during his last years.
Commander in chief of the Grand Army of the Republic from 1885 to 1886.
He founded the Arlington, Virginia neighborhood of Glencarlyn with his partner George W. Curtis in 1888.

When he was old he decided that he would like to visit the place where he was born. He travelled to England and stayed at the Old Manse (now 12, Green Rd) Broughton Astley, Leicestershire. He suddenly became ill, and some days later he died, on September 24, 1914, in the very room in which he had been born. He was buried with his wife, Nancy (1826–1906) in Arlington National Cemetery.

Legacy
He is the namesake of the community of Burdett, Missouri.

References

 

1836 births
1914 deaths
Military personnel from Leicestershire
General Land Office Commissioners
Union Army officers
Burials at Arlington National Cemetery
Republican Party members of the United States House of Representatives from Missouri
People from Broughton Astley
People from Lorain County, Ohio
People from DeWitt, Iowa
Grand Army of the Republic Commanders-in-Chief
19th-century American politicians
People from Osceola, Missouri
People from Arlington County, Virginia
Military personnel from Iowa